Associated Builders and Contractors (ABC) is a national U.S. trade association representing the non-union construction industry. ABC is an association of 69 chapters with more than 22,000 commercial contractors and construction-related firms among its members. The association was founded in Baltimore, Maryland in 1950 to advocate "for free enterprise and open competition in the U.S. construction industry."

Their positions regarding the Davis-Bacon Act and Project Labor Agreements often pit them in political battles against labor unions from the building trades.

The Center for Responsive Politics has designated ABC as a "Heavy Hitter", rating it among the largest overall contributors to federal elections over the past two decades. In the 2018 election cycle, ABC was the 285th-largest donor to federal candidates and committees, giving over $1.6 million.  The group also ranks among the 50 largest trade associations in the nation according to Washington Business Journal.

See also
 Merit shop

References

External links 
 

Construction and civil engineering companies of the United States
Trade associations based in the United States